Bezbog Peak is the rocky peak rising to 963 m in the north extremity of Kondofrey Heights on Trinity Peninsula in Graham Land, Antarctica.  It is surmounting Victory Glacier to the north and east.

The peak is named after Bezbog Peak in Pirin Mountain, Southwestern Bulgaria.

Location
German-British mapping in 1996.

Maps
 Trinity Peninsula. Scale 1:250000 topographic map No. 5697. Institut für Angewandte Geodäsie and British Antarctic Survey, 1996.
 Antarctic Digital Database (ADD). Scale 1:250000 topographic map of Antarctica. Scientific Committee on Antarctic Research (SCAR), 1993–2016

Notes

References
 Bezbog Peak. SCAR Composite Antarctic Gazetteer
 Bulgarian Antarctic Gazetteer. Antarctic Place-names Commission. (details in Bulgarian, basic data in English)

External links
 Bezbog Peak. Copernix satellite image

Mountains of Trinity Peninsula
Bulgaria and the Antarctic